Oswald Cyril Smith-Bingham (29 January 1904 – 27 January 1979) was a cricketer who played for India. He played three times for the Egypt national cricket team against HM Martineau's XI in the early 1930s and later played two first-class matches in India for a Viceroy's XI, including one against the MCC.

References

1904 births
1979 deaths
British expatriates in the Orange River Colony
British expatriates in Egypt
British people in colonial India